Ishwardi (Urdu: ایشوردی, Ish-shordi) is an upazila of Pabna District in Rajshahi Division. It is the westernmost upazila of Pabna district. Containing railway divisional headquarters, this city is a very important communication hub for Bangladesh Railway. Bangladesh's first nuclear power plant Rooppur Nuclear Power Plant is also being built here.

Etymology 
While many theories have been proposed about Ishwardi's etymology, no consensus has emerged.

According to Banglapedia, the name 'Ishwardi' means God's place.

Community Report on Pabna District (2013) says-

Geography
The upazila occupies an area of 250.89 sq. km. It is located between 24º03′ and 24º15′ north latitudes and between 89º00′ and 89º11′ east longitudes. The upazila is bounded on the north by Baraigram upazila and Lalpur upazila of Natore district, on the east by Atgharia upazila and Pabna Sadar upazila, on the south by Kumarkhali upazila and Mirpur upazila of Kushtia district and on the west by Bheramara upazila of Kushtia district. The river Padma flows beside Ishwardi and detaches this upazila from Kushtia district.

Climate 
A weather observatory was established in Ishwardi in 1963. Since then, the observatory is recording weather data. Its International Station Number is 41907. Highest maximum temperature ever recorded in Ishwardi is 44 °C and lowest minimum temperature ever recorded is 3.5 °C; which were recorded on May 13, 1970 and January 27, 1964 respectively. Highest 24 hour rainfall of 351 mm was recorded on July 11, 1976 in Ishwardi.

Demographics 
As of the 2011 Bangladesh census, Ishwardi has a population of 3,13,932, among whom 66,255 live in the urban areas and 2,47,677 live in the rural areas. The male population is 1,57,897 and female population is 1,56,035. This Upazila has a household of 73,373. Among them, urban household number is 15,332 and rural household number is 58,041. Ishwardi has an average literacy rate of 54.96% (7+ years), which is highest in Pabna district and also higher than the national average of 51.77% literate.

Among the total population of Ishwardi, 305033 confirmed to be Muslim, 8024 confirmed to be Hindu, 507 confirmed to be Christian, 11 confirmed to be Buddhist and 357 did not state in the 2011 Population and Housing census.

Majority of Ishwardi's inhabitants are ethnic Bengali who speak Bangla. Along with them, some Urdu speaking Bihari people also live here.

Administration

Local government 
The smallest rural local government unit in Bangladesh is Union council and the next upper level of this is Upazila Parishad. On the other hand, Municipal Corporation is the smallest unit for urban local government.

Upazila parishad 

Ishwardi thana was transformed into a upazila (sub-district) in 1982 by a government ordinance. As of 2022, the chairman of Ishwardi Upazila Parishad is Md. Nayeb Ali Biswas. Additionally, the current Vice Chairman is Md. Abdus Salam and Female Vice Chairman is Mst. Atia Ferdous.

Union council 
Ishwardi Upazila has seven Union councils: Dashuria, Luxmikunda, Muladuli, Paksey, Sahapur, Sara, and Solimpur. The union councils are subdivided into 128 mauzas and 126 villages.

Municipality 
Ishwardi Municipality is subdivided into 9 wards and 27 mahallas. The current Mayor is Isaac Ali Malitha.

Executive Department 
The current Upazila Nirbahi Officer of Ishwardi Upazila is P.M. Emrul Kayes.

Agriculture 
Ishwardi is a vast fertile plain which is suitable for agriculture. Paddy, wheat, sugarcane, betel leaf and vegetables are the main crops of this region. In addition, Litchi orchards are common in Ishwardi's households. People harvest Litchi commercially in their large orchards. This summer fruit is also considered the 'cash crop' of Ishwardi.

Ishwardi is a hub for agricultural research institutes. The headquarter of Bangladesh Sugarcrop Research Institute (BSRI) is located here. This institutes conducts research on crops like sugarcane, palm, date, stevia, sugar beet, nipa palm etc. Many varieties of these crops are developed and released from here. Bangladesh’s only Pulses Research Center (PRC) is also situated here. In this institute, scientists research on different species of pulses.

Along with these, Ishwardi contains regional research center of Bangladesh Agriculture Research Institute and Bangladesh Institute of Nuclear Agriculture. Moreover, Horticultural Center and Sericulture Development Board conduct their activity here.

Transport 
Ishwardi is well connected to the country's major cities by highways, railways and rivers. Lalon Shah Bridge and Hardinge Bridge connects Ishwardi Upazila to the south-western part of Bangladesh by highway and railway respectively. Ishwardi Railway Junction is one of the largest railway junctions in Bangladesh.

A port was also established in on the banks of Padma River to facilitate construction and future operation of Rooppur Nuclear Power Plant. The port became fully operational in 2020.

Ishwardi Airport is an airport located in Ishwardi which is currently not functional.

Industry

Ishwardi EPZ 
There is an Export Processing Zone in Ishwardi which is known as Ishwardi EPZ. It was established in 2001 on 308.97 acres of land as a special economic zone for producing export-oriented products. Investors from South Korea, India, Japan, China and Hong Kong have invested in Ishwardi EPZ. The EPZ mainly produces footwear & leather goods, wig, tent, industrial gloves, RMG, garment accessories, yarn, plastic goods, chemical & fertilizer, denim products etc.

Rooppur Nuclear Powerplant 

The Rooppur Nuclear Powerplant (Bengali: রূপপুর পারমাণবিক বিদ্যুৎকেন্দ্র) will be a 2.4 GWe nuclear power plant in Bangladesh. The nuclear power plant is being constructed at Rooppur of Ishwardi upazila in Pabna District, on the bank of the river Padma, 87 miles (140 km) west of Dhaka. It will be the country's first nuclear power plant, and the first of the two units is expected to go into operation in 2024. The VVER-1200/523 Nuclear reactor and critical infrastructures are being built by the Russian Rosatom State Atomic Energy Corporation. In the main construction period, the total number of employees will reach 12,500, including 2,500 specialists from Russia. It is expected to generate around 15% of the country's electricity when completed.

Banarasi Palli 
After the partition of India in 1947, many Banarasi craftsmen migrated to Ishwardi from North Indian regions and started living Ishwardi's Fateh Mohammadpur locality. They started weaving aristocratic sarees like Banarasi and Katan. Many of their descendants have preserved their ancestors' heritage till now. To expand the manufacturing and marketing of Banarasi products, Bangladesh Handloom Board established country's second-largest Banarasi Palli in 2004 at Ishwardi's Fateh Mohammadpur. But the Banarasi Palli was reported not to be fully functional. Many craftsmen are seen producing Banarasi sarees individually. The Banarasi Palli region remains very active during festivals like Eid.

Education 
Ishwardi Upazila has a handful of educational institutions. Some of the well-known secondary schools in Ishwardi are Ikkshu Gabeshawana High School, Bangladesh Railway Government Chandraprabha Vidyapitha, Govt. Sara Marwari Model High School and North Bengal Paper Mills High School. Among the higher secondary schools (or colleges, as they are termed in Bangladesh), Ishwardi Govt. College and Ishwardi Women’s College are reputed. In addition, Bangladesh Open University operates their branch in Ishwardi. Besides, a Vocational Training Institute is also situated here. Apart from these, there are some madrasahs in Ishwardi namely Mazdia Babul Ulum Islamia Fazil Madrasah, Ishwardi Alia Madrasah, Autapara A B Senior Alim Madrasah and so on.

Literary Works 
Celebrated Indian novelist Amiya Bhushan Majumdar's novel Garh Shrikhanda is based on the socio-economic condition of the Padma riparian areas of Ishwardi. This novel dates back to the 1940s. It was published in 1957 by Dey's Publishing at Kolkata.

Notable residents
Shankha Ghosh, Indian poet and literary critic, passed matriculation from Chandraprabha Vidyapitha, Ishwardi.
Amiya Bhushan Majumdar, celebrated Indian novelist.
Mozid Mahmud, poet, was born at Char Gargari village in 1966.
 Shamsur Rahman Sherif, MP, ex-minister of Ministry of Land, has been the Member of Parliament for constituency Pabna-4 since 1996.
Nuruzzaman Biswas - Bangladeshi politician & MP.

See also
Upazilas of Bangladesh
Districts of Bangladesh
Divisions of Bangladesh

References

External links 

Upazilas of Pabna District